Sir Harry Lushington Stephen, 3rd Baronet (2 March 1860 – 1 November 1945) was a British barrister and Judge of the Calcutta High Court.

The third son of Sir James Fitzjames Stephen, Harry Lushington was educated at Rugby School before matriculating at Trinity College, Cambridge in 1878, graduating LLB in 1882 and LLM in 1904. He was called to the Bar in 1885 and practised on the South Wales Circuit from 1886 to 1901. He became Judge of the High Court, Calcutta, on 18 November 1901. He was knighted in 1913. He retired in 1914.

On his return to England, he was Alderman of the London County Council from 1916 to 1928. He was appointed an Officer of the Order of the Crown of Belgium for services rendered in connection with the First World War. He died in 1945 at Hale Close, Fordingbridge.

In 1904, he married Barbara, youngest daughter of W Shore Nightingale of Embley Romsey and Lea Hurst, Derbyshire. He had one son, James Alexander Stephen, who succeeded to the baronetcy.

He is the author of Law of Support and Subsidence, 1890. It was "a useful little monograph". He was the editor of the fourteenth edition of Oke's Synopsis, the eighth edition of Oke's Formulist and State Trials: Political and Social, 1899.

References
Walter E. Houghton. "Stephen, Sir Harry Lushington" in Wellesley Index to Victorian Periodicals 1824-1900. Routledge. 2013. . Page 1087.

External links
 
 

1860 births
1945 deaths
Alumni of Trinity College, Cambridge
Baronets in the Baronetage of the United Kingdom
Stephen-Bell family
Knights Bachelor
Officers of the Order of the Crown (Belgium)
Judges of the Calcutta High Court
People educated at Rugby School
Members of the Inner Temple
Members of London County Council